Creaghan may refer to:

Paul Creaghan (born 1937), Canadian politician in the Legislative Assembly of New Brunswick
William Creaghan (1922–2008), Progressive Conservative party member of the House of Commons of Canada
 Spencer Creaghan, soundtrack producer for the album The Great and Secret Show
A stream in the barony of Armagh
 Creaghan Building, a building constructed in Miramichi, New Brunswick in 1924 designed by René-Arthur Fréchet
A townland in the parish of Clonfeacle, County Tyrone, Northern Ireland

See also
Creagan (disambiguation)